Georges Weill (31 January 1934 – 14 June 2022) was a French archivist and historian. He was an archivist for the Israelite Central Consistory of France from 1967 to 1980.

Weill died in Neuilly-sur-Seine, on 14 June 2022 at the age of 88.

Distinctions
Knight of the Ordre national du Mérite (1991)
Officer of the Ordre des Arts et des Lettres (1992)
Knight of the Legion of Honour (1999)

References

1934 births
2022 deaths
20th-century French historians
Historians of Jews and Judaism
French librarians
French archivists
Writers from Strasbourg
Officiers of the Ordre des Arts et des Lettres
Chevaliers of the Légion d'honneur
Knights of the Ordre national du Mérite
École Nationale des Chartes alumni